The Women's 470 Class Competition was a sailing event on the program at the 1996 Summer Olympics that was held from 24 July to 1 August 1996 in Savannah, Georgia, United States. Points were awarded for placement in each race. Eleven races were scheduled and sailed. Each team had two discards.

Results

Daily standings

Conditions at the 470 course areas

Notes

References 
 sports-reference
 
 
 

 
 

470 Women
470 competitions
Oly
Sail